The safseri, sometimes also spelled sefseri, safsari or sefsari, is a traditional Tunisian veil worn by women.

Composition 

The safseri is composed of a large piece of cloth covering the whole body. It usually has a cream colour and is made of cotton, satin or silk.

Depending on the regions of Tunisia, it can also be very colorful, especially in the south of the country.

Wear 
It is worn by women out of modesty to avoid male looks. In contemporary Tunisia, this cloth is mostly worn by senior women. Often a grandmother wears it while her daughter will not wear it. After the independence of Tunisia, the president Habib Bourguiba had tried, in vain, to have people abandon its use.

The cloth is today largely abandoned.

References 

Tunisian clothing
Islamic female clothing